Torii Glacier is a glacier flowing northwest between Mount Goossens and Mount Fukushima in the Queen Fabiola Mountains. Discovered on October 7, 1960, by the Belgian Antarctic Expedition, under Guido Derom, who named it after Tetsuya Torii, geochemist; leader of the Japanese party that visited this area in November 1960.

See also
 List of glaciers in the Antarctic
 Glaciology

References
 

Glaciers of Queen Maud Land
Prince Harald Coast